is a Japanese professional football club based in Suita, Osaka Prefecture. The club plays in the J1 League, which is the top tier of football in the country. The club's home stadium is Panasonic Stadium Suita. They form a local rivalry with Osaka city-based Cerezo Osaka.

Gamba Osaka is among the most accomplished Japanese clubs, having won several top-tier domestic titles, as well as the 2008 AFC Champions League.

Name origin 

The club's name Gamba comes from the Japanese , meaning "to do your best" or "to stand firm".

History 

It was founded in 1980 as Matsushita Electric SC by the mononymous company, which is now known as Panasonic, in Nara Prefecture and became a member of the Japan Soccer League. It was mostly made of remaining players and staff of the defunct Yanmar Club, the former B-team of Yanmar Diesel SC, later to be known as Cerezo Osaka. Gamba Osaka was an original member ("Original Ten") of the first J.League season.

In 2005, the club claimed its first J.League championship on a dramatic final day during which any of five clubs could have claimed the championship. Gamba needed to win, and have cross town rivals Cerezo Osaka draw or lose. Gamba defeated a valiant Kawasaki Frontale 4–2, while victory was snatched from Cerezo by a last-minute FC Tokyo equalizer. In an AFC Champions League match in 2006, Gamba Osaka defeated Vietnamese side Da Nang FC in a record-equaling victory of 15–0. In the 2008 Pan-Pacific Championship final, Gamba Osaka beat MLS club Houston Dynamo 6–1 to win the tournament, in large part because of Bare who scored 4 goals in the final (5 in all at the tournament). After his brilliant display and having just scored 10 goals in 18 games for Gamba in the domestic league, he was sold to UAE club Al-Ahli for 1 billion yen.

In October 2008, Gamba for the first time in their history, reached the final of the AFC Champions League after defeating fellow Japanese league rivals Urawa Red Diamonds 4–2 on aggregate after a 1–1 draw at home in the first leg, Gamba registered one of the most historic comebacks in Champions League history when they came back from being behind 1–0 before half time to win 1–3 with all goals scored in the second half at Saitama. Gamba Osaka went on to win the 2008 AFC Champions League title after winning 5–0 on aggregate against the giant-killing Australian club Adelaide United in the Final. They became the fifth Japanese club to win the maximum Asian title, after Urawa, Júbilo Iwata, then-company-affiliated Yomiuri (now Tokyo Verdy), and Furukawa Electric (now JEF United Ichihara Chiba).

In December 2008, Gamba made it to the semi finals of the 2008 FIFA Club World Cup after beating Australian club Adelaide United 1–0. They were beaten in the semifinals by 2007–08 Premier League and UEFA Champions League winners Manchester United. On 21 December 2008 they played for third place against Mexican side C.F. Pachuca with Gamba winning the match 1–0.

In December 2012, Gamba were relegated from Division 1 after losing 2–1 to Júbilo Iwata. Gamba finished 17th in the league despite scoring more goals than any other club, including Champion Sanfrecce Hiroshima. Ultimately, although Gamba had a positive goal difference at the end of the season, Gamba could not overcome their poor defense, which allowed the second most goals in Division 1 after Consadole Sapporo. This also made Gamba Osaka the fastest club to suffer relegation from the top division after winning the AFC Champion's League and playing in the FIFA Club World Cup, the relegation being only four years later. However, the club bounced back in the 2013 season, becoming the J2 Champion and directly promoting to Division 1 again after only one season.

In 2014, Gamba won the Division 1 title, a year after winning the second division, becoming the second club in the professional era to achieve this feat (after Kashiwa Reysol in 2011). That same year, Gamba also became the second club to win the domestic treble (after Kashima Antlers in 2000), by winning the J.League Cup and the Emperor's Cup as well.

Year 2015 saw Gamba Osaka return to the AFC Champions League for the first time since 2012, where they advanced to the semi-finals before being eliminated by The Tournament Winner and 2015 FIFA Club World Cup Fourth Place Guangzhou Evergrande 1–2 on aggregate. Domestically, Gamba Osaka advanced to the final of both the J.League Cup and the J1 League Championship, losing to Kashima Antlers 0–3 and Club World Cup Third Place Sanfrecce Hiroshima 3–4 respectively. Gamba Osaka successfully defended their status as Emperor's Cup winners, defeating Urawa Red Diamonds 2–1.

Stadium

Gamba Osaka used the Osaka Expo '70 Stadium in the Expo Commemoration Park as its home stadium from 1980 through 2015, which seats around 21,000.

The club began construction in December 2013 of a new soccer-specific stadium called Suita City Football Stadium in the same park, with a seating capacity of 	39,694. The new stadium had its inaugural official match during the Panasonic Cup on February 14, 2016, an exhibition match during which Gamba Osaka hosted fellow J1 club Nagoya Grampus.

Rivalries
Gamba's fiercest rival are fellow locals Cerezo Osaka with whom they contest the Osaka derby. Also have a heavy rivalry with Saitama's Urawa Red Diamonds, which they make the "National Derby" of Japan.

Record as J.League member

Players

Current squad

Out on loan

Notable players

 Greatest ever team
In 2011, as part of the club's official celebration of their 20th anniversary, supporters cast votes to determine the greatest ever team.
 Goalkeeper
  Yōsuke Fujigaya (2005–2013, 2015–2017)
 Defenders
  Akira Kaji (2006–2014)
  Sidiclei (2004–2007)
  Tsuneyasu Miyamoto (1995–2006)
  Satoshi Yamaguchi (2001–2011)
 Midfielders
  Yasuhito Endō (2001–2021)
  Tomokazu Myojin (2006–2015)
  Hideo Hashimoto (1998–2011)
  Takahiro Futagawa (1999–2016)
 Forwards
  Patrick M'Boma (1997–1998)
  Araújo (2005)

Coaching staff
For the 2023 season.

Honours
As both Matsushita (amateur era) and Gamba Osaka (professional era)

National

League 
J.League Division 1
Champions (2): 2005, 2014
JSL Division 2/J.League Division 2
 Champions (2): 1985–86, 2013

Cups
Emperor's Cup
Winners (5): 1990, 2008, 2009, 2014, 2015
J.League Cup
Winners (2): 2007, 2014
Japanese Super Cup
Winners (2): 2007, 2015
All Japan Senior Football Championship
Winners (1): 1983

International 
AFC Champions League
Winners: 2008
Pan-Pacific Championship
Winners: 2008

Manager history

Player statistics

Top scorers by season

Award winners
The following players have won the awards while at Gamba Osaka:

Domestic
J.League Player of the Year
 Araújo (2005)
  Yasuhito Endō (2014)
J.League Top Scorer
 Patrick M'Boma (1997)
 Araújo (2005)
 Magno Alves (2006)
J.League Best Eleven
 Patrick M'Boma (1997)
 Junichi Inamoto (2000)
  Yasuhito Endō (2003, 2004, 2005, 2006, 2007, 2008, 2009, 2010, 2011, 2012, 2014, 2015)
 Masashi Oguro (2004)
 Araújo (2005)
 Fernandinho (2005)
 Satoshi Yamaguchi (2006, 2007, 2008)
 Ryōta Tsuzuki (2006)
 Magno Alves (2006)
 Baré (2007)
 Patric (2014)
 Takashi Usami (2014, 2015)
 Yosuke Ideguchi (2017)
J.League Rookie of the Year
 Takashi Usami (2010)
J.League Cup MVP
 Michihiro Yasuda (2007)
 Patric (2014)
J.League Cup New Hero Award
 Michihiro Yasuda (2007)
 Takashi Usami (2014)

International
Asian Footballer of the Year
  Yasuhito Endō (2009)
AFC Champions League Most Valuable Player
  Yasuhito Endō (2008)
AFC Champions League Top Scorer
 Magno Alves (2006)
 Leandro (2009)

World Cup players
The following players have been selected by their country in the World Cup, while playing for Gamba Osaka:

  Patrick M'Boma (1998)
  Tsuneyasu Miyamoto (2002, 2006)
  Akira Kaji (2006)
  Yasuhito Endō (2006, 2010, 2014)
  Yasuyuki Konno (2010, 2014)
  Masaaki Higashiguchi (2018)

Olympic players
The following players have represented their country at the Summer Olympic Games whilst playing for Gamba Osaka:
 Shigeru Morioka (1996)
 Tsuneyasu Miyamoto (2000)
 Junichi Inamoto (2000)
 Ryōta Tsuzuki (2000)
 Michihiro Yasuda  (2008)
 Yosuke Ideguchi  (2016)
 Hiroki Fujiharu  (2016)

Former players

International results

Kit evolution

In popular culture
In the Captain Tsubasa manga series, two characters are from Gamba Osaka: the defender Makoto Soda and the forward Takashi Sugimoto.

Notes

References

External links

 Official website 
 Schedule on ESPN

 
J.League clubs
Japan Soccer League clubs
Football clubs in Osaka
Association football clubs established in 1991
Panasonic
Emperor's Cup winners
Japanese League Cup winners
1991 establishments in Japan
AFC Champions League winning clubs